Panagiotis Karatzas (18th century – 1824) was a Greek revolutionary leader in Patras during the Greek Revolution of 1821. During his childhood he showed his bravery and defiance against the Ottoman Empire, often fighting with Turkish peers. He fled to the Ionian Islands, then under British rule, he moved to Zakynthos and enrolled into the British Army in the 3rd Greek Legion. He returned to Patras in 1809.

He was one of the main commanders during the siege of Patras (1821). He was against the Ottoman-era local kodjabashis of the area. He was murdered by Greek rivals in 1824.

References
History of the Greek Revolution (Ιστορία της Ελληνικής Επανάστασης = Istoria tis Ellinikis Epanastasis), Volumes I and II, Spyridon Trikoupis, Nea Synora Publishers - A.A. Livani, Athens 1993 SET , Page 84
Istoria tis poleos Patron apo ton arheotaton hronon mehri tou 1921 (Ιστορία της Πόλεως Πατρών απο των αρχαιοτάτων χρόνων μέχρι του 1921 = History Of The City Of Patras From The Ancient Period Until 1921), Volume II, Stefanos Thomopoulos, Achaikes Publishers, Patras 1999, Page 349
Peloponisii agonistes tou 1821, Nikitara apomnimonevmata (Πελοποννήσιοι αγωνιστές του 1821, Νικηταρά απομνημονεύματα = Peloponnesian Revolutionary Leaders of 1821, Nikitaras Remembered), Fotakou, Vergina Publishers, Athens 1996
This article is translated and is based from the article at the Greek Wikipedia (el:Main Page)

1824 deaths
Greek military leaders of the Greek War of Independence
Military personnel from Patras
People murdered in Greece
Year of birth unknown